Felix Albert Welter (25 April 1898–1991) was a Luxembourgish jurist who served as president of the Council of State of Luxembourg from 1952 to 1969 and was a member of the European Commission of Human Rights from 1963 to 1975.

He married Marguerite Welter, who was the first woman to become a lawyer in 1923 in Luxembourg.

References

1898 births
1991 deaths
Presidents of the Council of State of Luxembourg
Luxembourgian judges of international courts and tribunals
Luxembourgian jurists
Members of the European Commission of Human Rights